Arethaea is a genus of katydids in the family Tettigoniidae. There are at least 14 described species in Arethaea.

Species
 Arethaea ambulator Hebard, 1936 (hill country thread-leg katydid)
 Arethaea arachnopyga Rehn & Hebard, 1914 (big bend thread-leg katydid)
 Arethaea brevicauda (Scudder, 1900) (California thread-leg katydid)
 Arethaea carita Scudder, 1902 (Carita thread-leg katydid)
 Arethaea constricta Brunner, 1878 (prairie thread-leg katydid)
 Arethaea coyotero Hebard, 1935 (Mojave thread-leg katydid)
 Arethaea gracilipes (Thomas, 1870) (thin-footed thread-leg katydid)
 Arethaea grallator (Scudder, 1877) (stilt-walker katydid)
 Arethaea mescalero Hebard, 1936 (mescalero thread-leg katydid)
 Arethaea phalangium (Scudder, 1877) (eastern thread-leg katydid)
 Arethaea phantasma Rehn & Hebard, 1914 (Rio Grande thread-leg katydid)
 Arethaea polingi Hebard, 1935 (Poling's thread-legged katydid)
 Arethaea sellata Rehn, 1907 (sellate thread-leg katydid)
 Arethaea semialata Rehn & Hebard, 1914 (chihuahuan thread-leg katydid)

References

 Capinera J.L, Scott R.D., Walker T.J. (2004). Field Guide to Grasshoppers, Katydids, and Crickets of the United States. Cornell University Press.
 Otte, Daniel (1997). "Tettigonioidea". Orthoptera Species File 7, 373.

Further reading

 

Phaneropterinae